Aramus may refer to:
Aramus (bird), a genus of birds containing the limpkin (Aramus guarauna) and several fossil species
Aramus, Armenia, a town
Aramus (horse), a champion Arabian horse